Diana Decker (born Isabella Charlotte Diana Decker, 9 January 1925 – 4 January 2019), was a British/American actress, singer, and television personality, who was popular from the 1940s to the early 1960s.

Early life
Decker was born to an American father and British mother in Hollywood, California.  At the age of four, she moved to Britain with her mother.

Career 
Her first film appearance was in 1943, an uncredited role in San Demetrio London, and the following year she appeared in the musical comedy Fiddlers Three. Further film roles followed, including parts in The Root of All Evil (1947), When You Come Home (1947), Murder at the Windmill (1949), Saturday Island (1949), A Man's Affair (1952), It Started in Paradise (1952), Will Any Gentleman...? (1953), and Is Your Honeymoon Really Necessary? (1953).  She specialised in "dizzy blonde" roles in light comedy films and also played this stereotype in a small part in her most significant film appearance in The Barefoot Contessa (1954). In 1947, Decker was also one of the first performers to gain fame from a television advertising campaign, playing "Miriam" in a Pepsodent commercial.

In 1953, Decker appeared in the British television comedy series Before Your Very Eyes!, starring Arthur Askey, and also chaired some editions of the television quiz Film Fanfare during the 1950s. She continued to act in films, including A Yank in Ermine (1955) and The Betrayal (1957), and featured in several episodes of the television drama series The Vise.

Decker's stage work included playing Billie Dawn in the Dublin (Gaiety Theatre) production of "Born Yesterday" in 1949, and she performed onstage in 1951-52 in William Chappell's The Lyric Revue at the Globe Theatre in London. In 1957, when BBC Radio revived Ian Messiter's comedy panel game One Minute Please! (upon which Just A Minute was based), Decker appeared as a regular panelist on the ladies' team, playing against Gerard Hoffnung, Eric Sykes and Messiter. It was hosted by broadcaster Michael Jackson, and lasted only one series. In 1959, she appeared in the musical The Quiz Kid at the Lyric Theatre in Hammersmith, London.

Decker had few credits in the 1960s, although she did play a supporting role in Stanley Kubrick's 1962 film of Lolita. Her final film appearance was in 1965: an atypical role in the horror film Devils of Darkness.

Decker also had a recording career. Her recording of "Poppa Piccolino", a version of the Italian song "Papaveri e papere" by Vittorio Mascheroni, with English words by Robert Musel, reached no.2 on the UK singles chart. However, a string of subsequent singles up to 1956 failed to chart.  Decker's recordings were reissued in 2002 on the CD The Complete Diana Decker.

Personal life 
Decker married Australian actor and musician Eden Landeryou, aka Eddy Eden in 1948. In 1954 Eden was fined £3, with £10 10s (10 guineas) costs, after hitting a man who criticised Decker's acting in the play Thirteen for Dinner and was alleged to have claimed, "she should have been strangled at birth".

In 2002, it was reported that Decker was living quietly in London. She died there in January 2019 at the age of 93.

Filmography

References

External links
  Diana Decker chairing a 1950s edition of Film Fanfare

1925 births
2019 deaths
American emigrants to the United Kingdom
American people of British descent
English women singers
English film actresses